Aristide Gunnella (born 1931) is an Italian politician from the Republican Party of which he was a member until July 1991. He was the minister of regional affairs in the period 1987–1988. While he was in active politics, he was considered to be the Republican Party's second in command and "viceroy in Sicily".

Biography
Gunnella was born in Mazara del Vallo on 18 March 1931 and hails from a Sicily-based family. He started his career in the 1960s.

From 1968 to 1992 he was a member of the chamber of deputies and was the undersecretary for foreign affairs in the period 1980–1981. He served as the minister of regional affairs between 28 July 1987 and 13 April 1988 in the cabinet led by Prime Minister Giovanni Goria. Gunnella was a member of the Republican party, but resigned from the party in July 1991. In fact, he was expelled from the party due to his close connections with Mafia leaders. Gunnella has had connections with two leading figures of the Sicilian Mafia: Giuseppe Di Cristina and Natale L'Ala. This group managed to increase votes of the Republican party in the region by 50% in the 1978 elections.

Gunnella is a freemason. He is the author of a book entitled Doppio volto della prima Repubblica which was published in 2018.

References

External links

21st-century Italian writers
1931 births
Deputies of Legislature IX of Italy
Deputies of Legislature X of Italy
Government ministers of Italy
Italian Freemasons
Italian Republican Party politicians
Living people
People from Mazara del Vallo